In New Zealand, community boards are governed by the provisions of Part 4 of the Local Government Act 2002 and can be created, or dissolved by territorial authorities, 40 out of 78 of which have 111 boards. In addition Auckland has 21 local boards and some councils have Community Committees.

Under the Local Electoral Act 2001, Boards must have at least four members but not more than twelve. At least four must be elected members, but up to half can be appointed by the council.

Their purpose is to:

 represent and act as an advocate for the interests of the community;
 consider and report on any matter referred to it by their council, and any issues of interest to the community board;
 make an annual submission to their council on expenditure;
 maintain an overview of services provided by their council within the community; and
 communicate with community organisations and special interest groups in the community, and undertake any other responsibilities delegated by their council.

Boards can have powers delegated to them by councils, but cannot own land, or employ staff.

Levels of delegation vary greatly: 25 councils (60%) give Boards power to make community grants, 11 (26%) power to run parks and reserves, 10 (24%) power to run community centres and sports and recreation and, in Southland, to spend up to $300,000 on projects. In Thames-Coromandel Boards have control of local harbours, parks, halls, libraries, airfields, swimming pools, toilets, cemeteries, buses, planning, grants, economic development and bylaws.

List of community boards

See also  
 Local boards of Auckland Council
 Civil parish

References 

Local government in New Zealand